"Araby" is a short story by James Joyce published in his 1914 collection Dubliners. The story traces a young boy's infatuation with his friend's sister.

Plot
Through first-person narration, the reader is immersed at the start of the story in the drab life that people live on North Richmond Street, which seems to be illuminated only by the verve and imagination of the children who, despite the growing darkness that comes during the winter months, insist on playing "until [their] bodies glowed." Even though the conditions of this neighbourhood leave much to be desired, the children's play is infused with their almost magical way of perceiving the world, which the narrator dutifully conveys to the reader:

But though these boys "career" around the neighbourhood in a very childlike way, they are also aware of and interested in the adult world, as represented by their spying on the narrator's uncle as he comes home from work and, more importantly, on Mangan's sister, whose dress “swung as she moved” and whose “soft rope of hair tossed from side to side.” These boys are on the brink of sexual awareness and, awed by the mystery of another sex, are hungry for knowledge.

On one rainy evening, the boy secludes himself in a soundless, dark drawing-room and gives his feelings for her full release: "I pressed the palms of my hands together until they trembled, murmuring: O love! O love! many times." This scene is the culmination of the narrator's increasingly romantic idealization of Mangan's sister. By the time he actually speaks to her, he has built up such an unrealistic idea of her that he can barely put sentences together: “When she addressed the first words to me I was so confused that I did not know what to answer. She asked me if I was going to Araby. I forget whether I answered yes or no.” But the narrator recovers splendidly: when Mangan's sister dolefully states that she will not be able to go to Araby, he gallantly offers to bring something back for her.

The narrator now cannot wait to go to the Araby bazaar and procure for his beloved some grand gift that will endear him to her. And though his aunt frets, hoping that it is not “some Freemason affair,” and though his uncle, perhaps intoxicated, perhaps stingy, arrives so late from work and equivocates so much that he almost keeps the narrator from being able to go, the intrepid yet frustrated narrator heads out of the house, tightly clenching a florin, in spite of the late hour, toward the bazaar.

But the Araby market turns out not to be the most fantastic place he had hoped it would be. It is late; most of the stalls are closed. The only sound is "the fall of the coins" as men count their money. Worst of all, however, is the vision of sexuality—of his future—that he receives when he stops at one of the few remaining open stalls. The young woman minding the stall is engaged in a conversation with two young men. Though he is potentially a customer, she only grudgingly and briefly waits on him before returning to her frivolous conversation. His idealized vision of Araby is destroyed, along with his idealized vision of Mangan's sister—and of love. With shame and anger rising within him, he is alone in Araby.

Themes

"Araby" touches on a great number of themes:

 coming of age
 meeting of imagination with reality 
 the life of the mind versus poverty  (both physical and intellectual)
 the consequences of idealization
 the Catholic Church's influence to make Dublin a place of asceticism where desire and sensuality are seen as immoral
 the pain that often comes when one encounters love in reality instead of its elevated form
 paralysis

These themes build on one another entirely through the thoughts of the young boy, who is portrayed by the first-person narrator, who writes from memory.

Romantic elements
"Araby" contains many themes and traits common to Joyce in general and Dubliners in particular. As with many of the stories in the collection, "Araby" involves a character going on a journey, the end result of which is fruitless, and ends with the character going back to where he came from. "Eveline" is just one other story in Dubliners to feature a circular journey in this manner. Also, the narrator lives with his aunt and uncle, although his uncle appears to be a portrait of Joyce's father, and may be seen as a prototype for Simon Dedalus of A Portrait of the Artist as a Young Man and Ulysses. The scorn the narrator has for his uncle is certainly consistent with the scorn Joyce showed for his father, and the lack of "good" parents is pertinent.

In "The Structure of Araby," Jerome Mandel notes the shared plot archetypes between “Araby” and traditional medieval romantic literature, positing that Joyce deliberately “structured with rigorous precision upon a paradigm of medieval romance.”

Later influence
Among later writers influenced by "Araby" was John Updike, whose oft-anthologized short story, "A&P", is a 1960s American reimagining of Joyce's tale of a young man, lately the wiser for his frustrating infatuation with a beautiful but inaccessible girl.  Her allure has excited him into confusing his emergent sexual impulses for those of honor and chivalry, and brought about disillusionment and a loss of innocence.

Media adaptations
In 1985, the Austin, Texas-based alternative rock group The Reivers released their Translate Slowly album whose lead track "Araby" was a literary adaptation of the story.
In 1999 a short film adaptation of "Araby" was produced and directed by Dennis Courtney with screenplay by Joseph Bierman.

References

Conboy, Sheila C. “Exhibition and Inhibition: The Body Scene in Dubliners.” Twentieth Century Literature. 37.4 (Winter 1991): 405-419.
French, Marilyn. “Missing Pieces in Joyce’s Dubliners. Twentieth Century Literature. 1.24 (Winter 1978): 443-472. 
Mandel, Jerome. “The Structure of ‘Araby.’” Modern Language Studies. 15.4 (Autumn 1985): 48-54.
Zoe Marduel. "Araby"

External links

Annotated hypertext version of "Araby"
Project Gutenberg version of Dubliners, including "Araby"
 

1914 short stories
Short stories by James Joyce
Short stories adapted into films
First-person narrative fiction